Pseudomonas marginalis is a soil bacterium that can cause soft rots of plant tissues. It infects poinsettia, lettuce, and crucifers (canola, mustard).

Based on 16S rRNA analysis, P. marginalis has been placed in the P. fluorescens group.

References

External links
 Type strain of Pseudomonas marginalis at BacDive -  the Bacterial Diversity Metadatabase

Pseudomonadales
Bacterial plant pathogens and diseases
Ornamental plant pathogens and diseases
Food plant pathogens and diseases
Lettuce diseases
Bacteria described in 1918